Guillermo Juan Vallori Grimalt (born 24 June 1982 in Palma de Mallorca) is a Spanish professional footballer who plays for CD Atlético Baleares as a central defender.

References

External links 

1982 births
Living people
Footballers from Palma de Mallorca
Spanish footballers
Association football defenders
Segunda División B players
Tercera División players
RCD Mallorca B players
CD Atlético Baleares footballers
Swiss Super League players
Grasshopper Club Zürich players
2. Bundesliga players
TSV 1860 Munich players
Spanish expatriate footballers
Spanish expatriate sportspeople in Switzerland
Spanish expatriate sportspeople in Germany
Expatriate footballers in Switzerland